The Gumihorn is a mountain of the Bernese Alps, the highest point of the Schynige Platte ridge, located at the western end of the Schwarzhorn group. It forms a limestone tower, overlooking the valley of the Lütschine. At , it is the highest summit lying west of the Loucherhorn.

The Gumihorn lies between the municipalities of Gsteigwiler and Gündlischwand, in the canton of Bern. Although its summit cannot be easily climbed, two other slightly lower summits on both sides of the peak can be easily reached from the Schynige Platte railway station, hence allowing a 360-degree view of the region. The highest is named Tuba or Daube (2,076 m; to the north) and the other, directly above the railway station, is named Geiss (2,067 m; to the south).

References

External links
Gumihorn on Hikr

Bernese Alps
Mountains of the Alps
Mountains of the canton of Bern
Mountains of Switzerland
Two-thousanders of Switzerland